Bronisław Kostkowski (March 11, 1915 – September 27, 1942) was a Polish and Roman Catholic seminarian. He was born in Słupsk. He was imprisoned in the Nazi Sachsenhausen concentration camp and later died at the Nazi Dachau concentration camp. He is one of the 108 Martyrs of World War II who were beatified by Pope John Paul II in 1999.

See also 
List of Nazi-German concentration camps
The Holocaust in Poland
World War II casualties of Poland

References

1915 births
1942 deaths
People from Słupsk
Sachsenhausen concentration camp prisoners
Polish people who died in Dachau concentration camp
108 Blessed Polish Martyrs